Kim Young-bae (Korean: 김영배, born 8 March 1967) is a South Korean activist and politician served as the former Mayor of Seongbuk from 2010 to 2018. On 15 April 2020, he was elected the Member of the National Assembly for Seongbuk 1st constituency.

Political career 
He joined politics during the 1995 local elections, when he contributed the election of Chin Young-ho as the Mayor of Seongbuk. He then served as the secretary to Chin until 2001; he was the youngest secretary to district mayors during that time.

In the 2002 presidential election, Kim worked close to the Millennium Democratic Party (MDP) candidate Roh Moo-hyun, who was later elected the new President of the Republic. He became an aide to Shin Kye-ryoon, who served as the Chief Secretary of the presidential transition team. After Roh took an oath as the President, Kim became an administrator, as well as a secretary of the Office of the President. In 2007, he projected the inter-Korean summit between Roh Moo-hyun and Kim Jong-il.

Prior to the 2008 election, Kim contested UDP preselection for Seongbuk 1st constituency but lost to Son Pong-suk. He instead contested as the Mayor of Seongbuk in the 2010 local elections, and defeated the incumbent Suh Chan-kyo. He was re-elected in 2014, defeating Kim Kyu-sung. He did not contest in 2018. He returned to the Blue House as the Secretary for Policy Coordination on 6 August 2018, despite his early denial. He was later promoted to the Secretary to the President for Civil Affairs on 21 January 2019.

In the 2020 election, Kim contested Democratic preselection for Seongbuk 1st constituency, and defeated the then incumbent MP You Seung-hee. However, You did not concede his defeat, and filed a lawsuit against Kim's 3 campaign members for breaching the Public Official Election Act. Nevertheless, Kim was confirmed as the Democratic candidate for Seongbuk 1st on 12 March. On 15 April, Kim successfully defeated the UFP candidate Han Sang-hak. He received 60.90%, the highest vote among the newly-elected Democratic candidates in Seoul.

Following the disastrous defeat of the Democratic Party in the 2021 by-elections, the party leadership was subsequently collapsed. As the incident provoked the leadership by-election, Kim announced his intention to run as one of five elected members of its Supreme Council on 15 April 2021, exactly after a year of his election as an MP. On 2 May, he received 13.46% and was elected as the 4th out of 5 vice presidents-elected. Only Jun Hye-sook came behind of Kim.

Education 
Kim attended Peniel High School before entering to Korea University, where he served as the President of the Student Council of College of Political Science and Economics. He obtained a bachelor's degree and a doctorate in political science and diplomacy, and a master's degree in public administration from the university. He flied to the United States in 2001, and gained another master's degree in public administration from Syracuse University in 2002.

Personal life 
He is married to Lee Ji-hyun; the couple has a son and a daughter. He is a Buddhist.

Election results

General elections

Local elections

Mayor of Seongbuk

References

External links 
 Kim Young-bae on Facebook

1967 births
Living people
South Korean politicians
South Korean activists